For guitarist Chad Crawford see Scary Kids Scaring Kids

Chad Crawford is the host of How to do Florida with Chad Crawford, a television and multimedia program in its 8th season as of 2017. Crawford is from Seminole County, Florida and graduated from Full Sail University.  He is married to Kristy Crawford. The couple mortgaged their house to establish Crawford Entertainment. How to do Florida entered its 8th season in 2017 and visit sights and showcases activities across Florida from Ocala's caves to grouper fishing on the Gulf of Mexico. During its third season the program drew an estimated 14 million viewers.

References

External links
How to do Florida website
Chad Crawford website

Living people
People from Seminole County, Florida
American television hosts
Year of birth missing (living people)